Valeri Didenko (born 4 March 1946) is a Soviet sprint canoeist who competed in the early 1970s. He won a gold medal in the K-4 1000 m event at the 1972 Summer Olympics in Munich.

Didenko also won three medals in the K-4 1000 m event at the ICF Canoe Sprint World Championships with two golds (1970, 1971) and a silver (1973).

References

External links
 
 

1946 births
Canoeists at the 1972 Summer Olympics
Living people
Olympic canoeists of the Soviet Union
Olympic gold medalists for the Soviet Union
Soviet male canoeists
Olympic medalists in canoeing
Russian male canoeists
ICF Canoe Sprint World Championships medalists in kayak
Medalists at the 1972 Summer Olympics